Yemen competed at the 2017 World Aquatics Championships in Budapest, Hungary from 14 July to 30 July.

Swimming

Yemen has received a Universality invitation from FINA to send three swimmers (two men and one woman) to the World Championships.

References

Nations at the 2017 World Aquatics Championships
Yemen at the World Aquatics Championships
Aqua